Holy Child School is a catholic-run convent school located in Guwahati, Assam, India. It was established in the 1970s by the Salesians Sisters and is run according to the principles and methods of the modern educator, St. John Bosco. It is an English medium school, owned by the Salesian Sisters of North India which has its headquarters in Shillong.

The school has a primary school building and a high school building, which are linked by a flight of open stairs. The campus playing fields are the middle field for games and sports, and the top field for recreation, breaks and picnics.

The first batch of students appeared in the HSLC (High School Leaving Certificate) exam in 1981. Today, the school serves more than 1500 students.

The annual school magazine is Zenith. Alumni are enrolled as members of National Association of the Past Pupils of the Salesian Sisters.

Schools in Guwahati
Christian schools in Assam
Girls' schools in Assam
1970 establishments in Assam
Educational institutions established in 1970